Ashley Johnson may refer to:

 Ashley Johnson (actress) (born 1983), American actress, voice actress and singer
 Ashley Johnson (rugby union) (born 1986), South African rugby union player
 Ashley S. Johnson (1857–1925), Protestant minister who founded Johnson University in Tennessee
 Ashley Johnson (footballer) (born 1990), American-born Puerto Rican footballer

See also
 Ashleigh Johnson (born 1994), American water polo player
 Ashley Johnston (born 1992), Canadian ice hockey player